Gervais Batota (born 10 March 1982 in Brazzaville) is a French-Congolese footballer. He currently plays for FCM Târgoviște. In January 2011 he signed a -year contract with  FUS de Rabat .

Sources 
 
 FIFA

1982 births
Living people
Republic of the Congo footballers
Republic of the Congo international footballers
AS Mangasport players
Expatriate footballers in Gabon
Sportspeople from Brazzaville
Republic of the Congo expatriate footballers
Expatriate footballers in France
Lyon La Duchère players

Association football forwards